In 1998, an underwater survey conducted off the coast of Israel by the Israeli Antiquities Authority (IAA), discovered the wreckage of a Hellenistic or Early Roman ship.  The ship is believed to have sunk sometime in the 1st or 2nd century BC.  The wreck itself is located approximately 100 m off the coast of Ashkelon, Israel at a depth of around 3–4 m in the Mediterranean Sea. The city of Ashkelon was once a bustling trade port however multiple ancient reports claim that Ashkelon was a poor site for a port, citing the frequent storms and lack of a safe harbor.

Excavation and artifacts 

The actual wooden frame of the ship has decayed but the majority of the heavy artifacts remain.  Associated with the ship are 4 large iron anchors, copper-alloy nails (both used and unused), lead-sheathing pieces, lead fishing-net sinkers, three bronze balance-scales, bronze cooking ware, an oil lamp, incense shovel, bronze ladle, and one copper-alloy trumpet.  Due to the lack of a main cargo among the wreckage, some scholars believe that the cargo would have been perishable.

Interpretation 
The presence of the incense shovel and ladle leads some to believe that they were part of some form of ritual ceremony.  This is supported by evidence of a Roman relief in which a sea captain is shown in front of an altar, praising his gods after a safe journey.  The various lead weights are believed to be associated with fishing nets.  The weights are very similar in form and function to those found on another Roman shipwreck located off the coast of Dor, Israel.  Due to a lack of materials that can be radio-carbon dated, the shipwreck has been dated to the 1st or 2nd century BC based on artifact typologies.

Further reading 
 Galili, E., et al. "A Hellenistic/Early Roman Shipwreck Assemblage off Ashkelon, Israel." International Journal of Nautical Archaeology 39.1 (2010): 125-145.
 Galili, Ehud, and Baruch Rosen. "Fishing Gear from a 7th‐Century Shipwreck off Dor, Israel." International Journal of Nautical Archaeology 37.1 (2008): 67-76.
 Galili, Ehud, John Peter Oleson, and Baruch Rosen. "A group of exceptionally heavy ancient sounding leads: new data concerning deep-water navigation in the Roman Mediterranean." The Mariner's Mirror 96.2 (2010): 136-148.
 Rosen, Baruch, and Ehud Galili. "Lead use on Roman ships and its environmental effects." International Journal of Nautical Archaeology 36.2 (2007): 300-307.
 Russell, Ben. "Roman and late-antique shipwrecks with stone cargoes: a new inventory." Journal of Roman Archaeology 26 (2013): 331-361.
 Strauss, J. (2013). Shipwrecks Database. Version 1.0. Accessed (date): oxrep.classics.ox.ac.uk/databases/shipwrecks_database/
 Casson, L., 1971, Ships and Seamanship in the Ancient World. Princeton.

References

Ancient shipwrecks
Ashkelon
Shipwrecks in the Mediterranean Sea